An apostolic administration in the Catholic Church is administrated by a prelate appointed by the pope to serve as the ordinary for a specific area. Either the area is not yet a diocese (a stable 'pre-diocesan', usually missionary apostolic administration), or is a diocese, eparchy or similar permanent ordinariate (such as a territorial prelature or a territorial abbacy) that either has no bishop (an apostolic administrator sede vacante, as after an episcopal death or resignation) or, in very rare cases, has an incapacitated bishop (apostolic administrator sede plena).

Characteristics 
Apostolic administrators of stable administrations are equivalent in canon law with diocesan bishops, meaning they have essentially the same authority as a diocesan bishop. This type of apostolic administrator is usually the bishop of a titular see.

Administrators sede vacante or sede plena only serve in their role until a newly chosen diocesan bishop takes possession of the diocese. They are restricted by canon law in what they can do to the diocese they temporarily administer. For example, such an administrator may not sell real estate owned by the diocese. This type of administrator is commonly an auxiliary bishop of the diocese, a priest serving as the vicar general of the diocese, or the ordinary of a neighboring diocese.

Normally when a diocese falls vacant, either the previously appointed Coadjutor bishop takes possession of the see or (lacking such successor) a vicar capitular/diocesan administrator is chosen locally, but the Pope, having full governmental power, can preempt this choice and name an apostolic administrator instead. Sometimes a retiring, promoted or transferred (arch)bishop is designated to be apostolic administrator until his successor is designated and takes office, sometimes the Metropolitan or a fellow suffragan is appointed.

Apostolic administrations
In March 2021, there were the following stable apostolic administrations, most administered by a (titular or external) bishop.

Most are of the Roman rite; most are in former or current communist countries.
 Apostolic Administration of Atyrau, in Kazakhstan, suffragan of the Metropolitan  Archbishopric of Astana
 Apostolic Administration of the Caucasus, immediately subject to the Holy See, established in 1991 for two predominantly Orthodox former Soviet Republics: Georgia (the cathedral is in its capital Tbilisi) and Armenia
 Apostolic Administration of Estonia, one of the Baltic Countries; immediately subject to Rome, established in 1924, with its cathedral in the capital Tallinn
 Apostolic Administration of Harbin in the People's Republic of China, immediately subject to Rome, established in 1935, with a cathedral and a bishop without papal mandate since 2012, recognized from the Holy See in 2018
 Apostolic Administration of Kyrgyzstan, a mainly Islamic former Soviet Republic in Central Asia; immediately subject to Rome, founded in 1997 as a mission sui juris and promoted in 2006
 Apostolic Administration of Uzbekistan, predominantly Islamic former Soviet Republic in Central Asia, immediately subject to Rome, founded in 1997 as a mission sui juris and promoted in 2005.

Some apostolic administrations have jurisdiction not only over Latin Rite Catholics, but also over Catholics of other rites, not having their own jurisdictions there:
 Apostolic Administration of Southern Albania, with pro-cathedral see at Vlorë, established in 1939 for all Catholics in southern regions of Albania, both of Latin and Byzantine rites; since 2005, it is suffragan of the Metropolitan of Tirana–Durrës.

Also some apostolic administrations have jurisdiction only over Catholics of the Byzantine Rite, that not having their own jurisdictions there:
 Apostolic Administration of Kazakhstan and Central Asia for Faithful of Byzantine Rite, with a see in Karaganda, for Kazakhstan, Kyrgyzstan, Tajikistan, Turkmenistan and Uzbekistan.

Diocese of Pyongyang 
The Diocese of Pyongyang, North Korea: its last official bishop, Francis Hong Yong-ho, was imprisoned by the communist regime of Kim Il-sung in 1949 and later disappeared. The Metropolitan Archbishop of Seoul (South Korea) acts as the Apostolic Administrator in Pyongyang, as religion is suppressed in North Korea.

Personal Apostolic Administration of Saint John Mary Vianney
In addition, the Personal Apostolic Administration of Saint John Mary Vianney is a non-territorial jurisdiction, similar to a personal prelature, which is exempt, i.e. immediately subject to the Holy See, not part of any ecclesiastical province. It is a separate particular church for traditionalist Catholics within the Brazilian Diocese of Campos, a suffragan of the Metropolitan Archdiocese of Niterói.

The personal apostolic administration was formed by Pope John Paul II to administer to a group of traditionalist Catholic priests, using the Tridentine Mass, who reconciled with Rome on January 18, 2002. The group had been formed by bishop Antônio de Castro Mayer and had been associated with the Society of St. Pius X of Archbishop Marcel Lefebvre.

Temporary administration of vacant sees 
It is fairly typical that the pope appoints an Apostolic Administrator to a diocese which lacks an ordinary (bishop), thus replacing the diocesan administrator. Usually, the emeritus bishop will be appointed in such a case. Recently (and in exception to the latter), the archdiocese of St. Andrews and Edinburgh had Philip Tartaglia under this procedure.

For example, Luis Antonio Tagle was appointed as Prefect of Congregation for the Evangelization of Peoples on 9 December 2019, and he took office in February 2020. Broderick Soncuaco Pabillo, the current Auxiliary Bishop of Manila, was appointed as Apostolic Administrator.

Michael Yeung Ming-cheung, the Bishop of Hong Kong died on 3 January 2019. Cardinal John Tong Hon, Bishop Emeritus, was appointed as Apostolic Administrator.

There is also the ability for the Pope to appoint an apostolic administrator sede plena. Anthony Sablan Apuron, the Archbishop of Agana was under investigation for sexual abuse in June 2016. Pope Francis appointed Savio Hon Tai-fai as apostolic administrator sede plena, as temporary replacement. On 31 October 2016, Michael J. Byrnes, then Auxiliary Bishop of Detroit, was appointed Coadjutor Archbishop of Agana with full administrative authority, and later succeeded as Archbishop.

Former Apostolic administrations

Latin in Europe 
 Apostolic Administration of Český Těšín (Czech Republic)
 Apostolic Administration of Drohiczyn (Poland; promoted Roman Catholic Diocese of Drohiczyn)
 Apostolic Administration of the Free City of Danzig (Free City of Danzig, currently Poland; promoted Diocese of Danzig, later renamed Diocese of Gdańsk and finally promoted Roman Catholic Archdiocese of Gdańsk)
 Apostolic Administration of Eastern Siberia (Russia)
 Apostolic Administration of Eupen–Malmedy–Sankt Vith (Belgium; promoted Diocese of Eupen–Malmedy, later suppressed into Liège diocese)
 Apostolic Administration of European Russia
 Apostolic Administration of Görlitz (Germany; promoted Diocese)
 Apostolic Administration of Haarlem (Netherlands; promoted Diocese, renamed Haarlem–Amsterdam)
 Apostolic Administration of Kamień, Lubusz and the Prelature of Piła with see in Gorzów Wielkopolski (Poland; dissolved 1972 and split into 3 parts, promoted: Diocese of Gorzów, renamed in 1992 Zielona Góra-Gorzów, Diocese of Szczecin-Kamień, later promoted Archdiocese, and Diocese of Koszalin-Kołobrzeg, with small easternmost fragment awarded to Diocese of Chełmno)
 Apostolic Administration of Lubaczów (promoted and renamed diocese of Zamość-Lubaczów, Poland)
 Apostolic Administration of Moldova (Moldavia; now diocese of Chisinau)
 Apostolic Administration of Northern European Russia
 Apostolic Administration of Novosibirsk (Russia)
 Apostolic Administration of Opole (Poland; promoted Diocese)
 Apostolic Administration of Prizren, a former diocese (and later titular bishopric) in Kosovo (ex-Yugoslavian autonomous province in Serbia) (in 1969 absorbed by Skopje in the present North Macedonia), restored in 2000, elevated in 2018 as diocese, immediately subject to Rome
 Apostolic administration of Schwerin (partitioned Germany, merged into Hamburg archbishopric)
 Apostolic Administration of Southern European Russia
 Apostolic Administration of Trnava (Slovakia; promoted Archdiocese, lost Metropolitan status when restored after merger into Bratislava)
 Apostolic Administration of Tütz (then Germany, currently Poland; see moved to Schneidemühl (now Piła), elevated to Roman Catholic Territorial Prelature of Schneidemühl, later made part of the Apostolic Administration of Kamień, Lubusz and the Prelature of Piła)
 Apostolic Administration of Upper Silesia (Poland; now Archdiocese of Katowice)
 Apostolic Administration of Western Siberia (Russia)
 Apostolic Administration of West Flanders (Dutch: West-Vlaanderen), province in Belgium; promoted diocese and renamed Bruges (Brugge) after its see)
 Apostolic Administration of Yugoslav Bačka (Serbia; now Diocese of Subotica)
 Apostolic Administration of Yugoslav Banat (Serbia; now Diocese of Zrenjanin)
 Archdiocese of Białystok (Poland; formerly an Apostolic administration as part of Archdiocese of Vilnius, Lithuania)

Eastern Catholic in Europe 
 Apostolic Administration of Lemkowszczyzna (Poland; Ukrainian Catholic, promoted Apostolic Exarchate, suppressed)
 Ruthenian Catholic Apostolic Administration of Bosnia-Hercegovina (Bosnia and Herzegovina, Byzantine Rite; suppressed)
 Ruthenian Catholic Apostolic Administration of Targul-Siret (Romania, Byzantine Rite; suppressed)

Latin Overseas 
 In Asia
 Apostolic Administration of Almaty (Kazachstan; promoted Diocese)
 Apostolic Administration of Astana (Kazachstan; promoted Archdiocese)
 Apostolic Administration of Kazakhstan (promoted Diocese and renamed Karaganda after its see)
 ''Apostolic Administration of Latakia (Maronite, Syria; now an Eparchy: Eastern Catholic Diocese)
 Apostolic Administration of Okinawa and the Southern Islands, alias Ryukyus (Japan; now Diocese of Naha)

 In America
 Apostolic Administration of Copiapó (Chile; now a diocese)
 Apostolic Administration of El Petén (Guatemala; promoted Apostolic Vicariate)
 Apostolic Administration of Izabal (Guatemala; now a diocese)
 Apostolic Administration of Rio Branco (Brazil; promoted Territorial Prelature, renamed and again promoted Diocese of Roraima)

 In Africa
 Apostolic Administration of the Comoros Archipelago (Comoros; now Apostolic Vicariate of the Comoros Archipelago)
 Apostolic Administration of Mbuji-Mayi (now Diocese of Mbujimayi, in Congo)
 Apostolic Administration of Zanzibar and Pemba (now Diocese of Zanzibar, in Tanzania)

See also 

 List of Catholic dioceses (alphabetical)
 List of Catholic dioceses (structured view)
 List of Catholic archdioceses
 List of Military Ordinariates and/or Catholic military (arch)bishoprics
 List of Catholic apostolic vicariates
 List of Eastern Catholic (Apostolic, Patriarchal and other) Exarchates
 List of Apostolic Prefectures
 List of Territorial Prelatures
 List of Catholic Missions sui juris
 Reorganization of occupied dioceses during World War II

Notes and references

Sources and external links 
 GCatholic

 
Catholic ecclesiastical titles

cs:Apoštolská administratura#Apoštolský administrátor